Michael W. Clune is an American writer and critic. His creative and critical writing has appeared in Harper's, Salon, Granta, PMLA, the New Yorker, and other publications.

Biography 
Clune was born in Ireland and grew up in Chicago. He received his BA from Oberlin College, and his PhD from Johns Hopkins University. He is currently the Samuel B. and Virginia C. Knight Professor of Humanities in the Department of English in the College of Arts and Sciences at Case Western Reserve University in Cleveland.

Writing 
Clune's memoir, White Out: The Secret Life of Heroin, was chosen as a Best Book of 2013 by The New Yorker, NPR's On Point, and other venues. The critic Gideon Lewis-Kraus wrote that "the unusual risk taken by Clune's unusually good addiction memoir is its enduring lyrical reverence for heroin," and worried that this might inadvertently make the drug seem attractive to readers. One critic noted that White Out and Clune's academic book Writing Against Time deal in similar ways with the human desire to experience the world as if for the first time.

Clune's second work of creative nonfiction, Gamelife, was published by Farrar, Straus and Giroux in 2015. The critic Bijan Stephen wrote that Clune describes computer games as "spiritual experiences," and argued that Clune addresses heroin and games "in the same transcendent manner."

In 2019, Clune was named a Fellow by the John Simon Guggenheim Memorial Foundation.

References

External links 
Official Website
Interview with Michael Clune in The Believer
Interview with Michael Clune in Fanzine
Radio Interview with Michael Clune on NPR's "All Things Considered"

American male writers
Year of birth missing (living people)
Living people
21st-century American writers